Buscheto or Busketus (Pisa-Italy, XI–XII) was an Italian architect.
He designed the plans for Pisa's Cathedral Square and created the distinct Pisan Romanesque design style used throughout the square.

References

External links

 Tuscany Pass

People from Pisa
11th-century births
12th-century deaths
11th-century Italian architects
12th-century Italian architects
Romanesque architects